Stehle is a surname. Notable people with the surname include:

 Adelina Stehle (1860-1945), Austrian-Italian opera singer
 Chelo Alvarez-Stehle, Spanish-American journalist and documentary filmmaker
 Dominik Stehle (born 1986), German alpine ski racer
 Emilio Lorenzo Stehle (1926-2017), German-Ecuadorian Catholic bishop
 Evi Sachenbacher-Stehle (born 1980), German cross-country skier and biathlete
 Helli Stehle (1907-2017), Swiss actress and radio presenter
 Simon Stehle (born 2001), German footballer
 Sophie Stehle (1838-1921), German opera singer
 Thomas Stehle (born 1980), German footballer

German-language surnames